Let's Do It for Johnny is the third studio album by American rock band Bowling for Soup, released on May 16, 2000, by Jive Records. It was recorded at Reel Time Audio in Denton, Texas, about 100 miles from where the band was formed in Wichita Falls, and featured the group's first hit, "The Bitch Song." The album name is a reference to The Outsiders. It is the first album with Gary Wiseman on drums. The album also features a cover of Bryan Adams' "Summer of '69".

The band re-recorded several of their older songs for this album. Tracks 6, 7, and 8 appeared on the album Rock on Honorable Ones!!, tracks 1, 2, 4, 5, and 9 originally appeared on the EP Tell Me When to Whoa, and track 8 appeared on both Rock on Honorable Ones!! and Tell Me When to Whoa.

Production and recording
It was announced in a band newsletter on July 2, 1999 that drummer Lance Morrill decided to quit the band to focus on the family life after recently getting married. Longtime friend Gary Wiseman would be welcomed as the bands new drummer and would soon get to work recording a new album.
On January 12, 2000 the band made it known that they have been in the recording studio and that they have signed to Jive Records. The title was first mentioned as "Let's Do It For Jonnie" but Jonnie was later changed to Johnny for unknown reasons. The title takes its name from the 1983 Francis Ford Coppola film "The Outsiders".
Tracks such as "Belgium", "Scope", and "The Bitch Song" were remixed from previous albums by Matt Wallace of Everlast and Faith No More fame.
Additionally the band recorded a song "The Greatest Day" for a penned Tiger Woods video game.

Track listing

Singles
Bowling for Soup made two singles of this album in 2000.
 "The Bitch Song" has a video, where the band is playing the song in a prison, while Jaret remembers the good moments with his girlfriend, whom he calls a bitch.
 "Suckerpunch" has no video, but the band considers this song as a single and plays it in all their live concerts.

Personnel

Bowling for Soup:
 Jaret Reddick — vocals, rhythm guitar
 Erik Chandler — bass, vocals
 Chris Burney — lead guitar, vocals
 Gary Wiseman — drums, vocals on "All Figured Out"

Production:
 Produced by Eric Delegard
 Co-Produced by Jaret Reddick
 Engineered by Eric Delegard at Reel Time Audio, Denton, TX
 Mixed by Tom Soares at Electric Lady Studios, NYC Except "The Bitch Song" Mixed by Matt Wallace at Encore Studios, Burbank, CA
 Recording Assistant: Michael England
 Mix Assistants: Shinobu Mitsuoka and James McCrone
 Drum Techs: Rob Avsharian and Matt Thompson
 Mastered by Greg Calbi at Sterling Sound, NYC

Additional musicians:
 Casey Diiorio — Guitars on "Pictures He Drew" and "Boulevard"
 Matt Slider and Eric Delegard — Vocals on "All Figured Out"
 Joe Cripps — percussion on "Pictures He Drew," "Scope," "Dances With You," "Belgium," "Hang On" and "All Figured Out"
 Mike Duffy — Percussion on "The Bitch Song"
 Michel England — Guitar on "All Figured Out"
 Management: Jeff Roe for FFroe Management
 For Booking: Michael Arfin for QBQ Entertainment
 Gilbert Garza: Stage Manager
 Sweet Charlie: Merchandise and Assistant to Mr. Von Erich
 Legal Representation: Mike McKoy - Serling, Rooks and Ferrara

References

External links

 Let's Do It for Johnny! at YouTube (streamed copy where licensed)

Jive Records albums
2000 albums
Bowling for Soup albums